Oro Blanco ( BCS: ORO BLANCO) is an investment company based in Chile. Through its 83.23%-owned subsidiary Calichera, the company holds interests in the Chilean Chemical company SQM. The company's majority  shareholder is Norte Grande, with 86.1% of its interests.

According to the fact finding website, "snopes.com".  The claims made by Oro Blanco, through a viral marketing advertisement created by Kent Moors, are fraudulent   The 'superfuel' turns out to be lithium, which is mined as the mineral lithium carbonate. Purified lithium is used in lithium-ion batteries (which include the batteries that power electric cars), though the advertisement persistently omits to mention the word "lithium".

References

Investment companies of Chile
Companies based in Santiago Metropolitan Region
Financial services companies established in 1983
Chilean companies established in 1983